is a 1978 French-Japanese film produced, written and directed by Nagisa Ōshima, based on a novel by Itoko Nakamura. The film was a co-production between Oshima Prods. and Argos Films.

Plot
In 1895 a rickshaw runner arrives home in a village in Japan. His wife Seki is sexually assaulted by a young neighbour, Toyoji. They became lovers. He's very jealous of Seki's husband and decides that they should kill him. One night, after the husband has had plenty of shōchū to drink and is in bed, they strangle him and dump his body down a well. To avert any suspicions, Seki pretends her husband has gone off to Tokyo to work. For three years Seki and Toyoji secretly see each other. Their relationship has moments of intense passion, but the young man starts to distance himself from Seki. Finally, suspicions in the village become very strong and people begin to gossip. To make matters worse, her husband's ghost begins to haunt her and the law arrives to investigate her husband's disappearance.

Cast
 Tatsuya Fuji - Toyoji
 Kazuko Yoshiyuki - Seki
 Takahiro Tamura - Gisaburo
 Takuzo Kawatani - Inspector Hotta
 Akyoshi Fujiwara
 Masami Hasegawa - Oshin
 Kenzo Kawarazaki
 Tatsuya Kimura
 Eizo Kitamura
 Akiko Koyama - Mother of Landowner
 Osugi - Dancer
 Sumie Sasaki - Odame
 Takaki Sugiura
 Rinichi Yamamoto
 Taiji Tonoyama - Toichiro

Release
The film was Japan's submission to the 51st Academy Awards for the Academy Award for Best Foreign Language Film, but was not accepted as a nominee. The film was entered into the 1978 Cannes Film Festival, where Ōshima won the award for Best Director. The film was released on DVD by Fox Lorber Films in 2000 under the title In the Realm of Passion.

See also
Cinema of Japan
 List of submissions to the 51st Academy Awards for Best Foreign Language Film
List of Japanese submissions for the Academy Award for Best Foreign Language Film

References

External links
 
 
 
 Empire of Passion: Love’s Phantom an essay by Tony Rayns at the Criterion Collection
 

1978 films
1978 drama films
French drama films
Japanese drama films
Films directed by Nagisa Ōshima
1970s Japanese-language films
Adultery in films
Films produced by Anatole Dauman
Films scored by Toru Takemitsu
1970s Japanese films
1970s French films